Locust Grove, Kentucky can refer to three different places:

Locust Grove, Clark County, Kentucky 
Locust Grove, Pendleton County, Kentucky
Historic Locust Grove farm in Louisville, home of George Rogers Clark